Celles-sur-Durolle is a commune in the Puy-de-Dôme department in Auvergne-Rhône-Alpes in central France. The town was known by the name of Celles until 1929.

Neighbouring towns 
 In Puy-de-Dôme: Arconsat, Chabreloche, La Monnerie-le-Montel, Palladuc, Saint-Victor-Montvianeix and Viscomtat
 In Allier: Lavoine
 In Loire: Saint-Priest-la-Prugne.

Population

See also 
 Communes of the Puy-de-Dôme department

References 

Communes of Puy-de-Dôme